Texas state elections in 2020 were held on Tuesday, November 3, 2020. Its primaries were held on March 3, 2020, with runoffs taking place on July 14.

In addition to the U.S. presidential race, Texas voters elected the Class II U.S. Senator from Texas, 1 of 3 members of the Texas Railroad Commission, 8 of 15 members of the Texas Board of Education, all of its seats to the House of Representatives, 4 of 9 seats on the Supreme Court of Texas, 3 of 9 seats on the Texas Court of Criminal Appeals, 21 of 80 seats on the Texas Appellate Courts, all of the seats of the Texas House of Representatives and 17 of 34 seats in the Texas State Senate.

To vote by mail, registered Texas voters had to request a ballot by October 23, 2020. After the U.S. Supreme Court rejected a bid to expand eligibility for requesting postal ballots, postal ballots were available only to voters over 65, those sick or disabled, those who were out of their county on election day and those who were in jail (and otherwise eligible to vote), as defined by Texas law.

Federal offices

President of the United States

Texas has 38 electoral votes in the Electoral College.

United States Class II Senate Seat

United States House of Representatives

There were 36 U.S. Representatives in Texas up for election in addition to 6 open seats.

Railroad Commission

Republican primary
Nominee
James Wright

Eliminated in primary
Ryan Sitton (incumbent and chair of the commission)
Primary Results

Democratic primary 
Nominee
Chrysta Castañeda

Eliminated in runoff
Roberto Alonzo

Eliminated in primary
Kelly Stone
Mark Watson

Runoff Election Primary Results

Primary Results

Other candidates
Katija "Kat" Gruene (Green) (aka Kat Swift) (nominee) 
Matt Sterett (Libertarian) (nominee)
Charlie Stevens (Libertarian) (defeated at party convention)

Polling

Results

State Board of Education
8 of 15 seats of the Texas Board of Education were up for election. Before the election the composition of that board was:

Member, District 1

Republican primary

Democratic primary

General election

Member, District 5

Republican primary

Democratic primary

Libertarian convention

General election

Member, District 6

Republican primary

Democratic primary

Libertarian convention

General election

Member, District 8

Republican primary

Libertarian convention

General election

Member, District 9

Republican primary

Democratic primary

General election

Member, District 10

Republican primary

Democratic primary

Libertarian convention

General election

Member, District 14

Republican primary

Democratic primary

General election

Member, District 15

Republican primary

Democratic primary

General election

State Judiciary
Each of the state's two courts of last resort have 9 seats, all of which are currently occupied by Republican incumbents.

Supreme Court Chief Justice

Republican primary

Candidates
Nathan Hecht, incumbent Chief Justice of the Supreme Court of Texas

Results

Democratic primary

Candidates
Amy Clark Meachum, Travis County district judge
Jerry Zimmerrer, incumbent Associate Justice of the Fourteenth Court of Appeals of Texas

Results

General election

Polling

Results

Supreme Court Place 6

Republican primary

Candidates
Jane Bland, incumbent Associate Justice of the Supreme Court of Texas

Results

Democratic primary

Candidates
Kathy Cheng, attorney and nominee for Supreme Court of Texas in 2018
Larry Praeger, former prosecutor

Results

General election

Polling

Results

Court of Appeals Place 3

Texas Court of Criminal Appeals

State Legislature
All 150 seats of the Texas House of Representatives and 16 of 31 seats of the Texas State Senate are up for election.

State Senate

Before the election the composition of the state senate was:

House of Representatives

Before the election the composition of the state house was:

See also
 Postal voting in the United States, 2020
 Bilingual elections requirement for Texas (per Voting Rights Act Amendments of 2006)

Notes

Partisan clients

References

Further reading

External links

 Elections Division at the Texas Secretary of State official website
 
 
 
 
  (State affiliate of the U.S. League of Women Voters)
 
 . (Guidance to help voters get to the polls; addresses transport, childcare, work, information challenges)
 

 
Texas